Ningbo Lishe International Airport  is the principal airport serving Ningbo, a major city in the Yangtze River Delta region and the second largest city in Zhejiang Province, China.

In 2013, the airport handled 5.4 million passengers, ranking 36th in China. It was the 29th busiest airport in China in cargo traffic in 2012.

History
Ningbo's Lishe was an auxiliary air force base of the Republic-era Chinese Nationalist Air Force, and was the final launching point of Martin B-10 bombers commanded by Captain Xu Huansheng and Lieutenant Tong Yanbo of the 14th Bomber Squadron of the 8th Bomber Group in their famous transoceanic raid to Nagasaki and other cities in the Empire of Japan on 19–20 May 1938.

Lishe airport was opened for civil service on 16 November 1984 when a CAAC Antonov AN-24 aircraft landed at the military Ningbo Zhuangqiao Airport.

In 1985, the Central Government of China approved the construction of Ningbo Lishe Airport. On 30 June 1990, it opened for service and became the first civil-only airport in Zhejiang. The construction cost was RMB 126 million.

In July 1992, the airport opened for international service. The first international service was opened to Hong Kong later the same year. In November 1998, service to Macau with onward code-share connection to Taipei and Kaohsiung started. International cargo flights started by the end of 1998.

In March 1997, Great Wall Airlines established a hub at the facility. The airport has services to 38 domestic destinations in China and international services to Hong Kong, Seoul, and Macau. It is served by 16 airlines.

It was renamed Ningbo Lishe International Airport from Ningbo Lishe Airport on 29 November 2005.

Growth
The airport is one of the fastest growing in China. In 1992, 286,021 passengers and 4,064 tons of cargo passed through the airport. In 2002, the figures grew to 1.28 million passengers and over 20,000 tons of cargo. Annual growth rate is 17.8% and 19.8% for passenger traffic and cargo traffic respectively.

In 2004, the airport handled 1.85 million passengers and 34,800 tons of cargo. It was expected to handle 2.3 million passengers and 52,000 tons of cargo in 2008.

Foreign investment
Its operator signed a strategic partnership agreement on 10 June 2005 with Fraport, the operator of Frankfurt Airport under which it will sell a 25% stake to the German airport operator.

Facilities
A new passenger terminal was opened on 8 October 2002 at a construction cost of RMB 770 million with an annual capacity of 3.8 million passengers. It can handle 1,700 passengers at maximum per hour. The departure lounge occupies 43,500 m2. The new apron occupies an area of 87,000 m2. The new terminal has 16 departure gates and 7 jetways. The new parking facility associated has 360 parking spaces.

Airlines and destinations

Passenger

Cargo

Ground transportation
Free bus service between the airport and Lishe International Airport Station is available every 10 minutes. There are limousine airport buses to downtown Ningbo every hour. There are buses to prefectures farther away from Ningbo with less frequency.

See also

List of airports in the People's Republic of China
List of the busiest airports in the People's Republic of China

References

External links

 Official website (in Chinese)
 Official website (in English)

Airports in Zhejiang
Transport in Ningbo
Airports established in 1990
1990 establishments in China